Roberta H. Martinez (born June 18, 1952) is an American writer. She is probably best known for her 2009 book, Latinos in Pasadena.

Early life and education 
Martinez was born in Los Angeles, California. She was delivered by a Chinese doctor in what is known as Chinatown at the (then) French Hospital. She was raised in East Los Angeles, California by her parents. Her parents married at an older age and she is an only child. Martinez received her early education in the Los Angeles Unified School District. She attended Eastman Avenue Elementary School, Robert Louis Stevenson Jr. High School, and Garfield High School. She attended High School during the Chicano movement that occurred in the 1960s, otherwise known as the Civil Rights Era. She graduated from high school in January 1970. Her academic performance was not great, but that did not dismantle her love for education. Martinez still had aspirations in pursuing higher education due to her parents’ strong educational values and influences. Her parents always encouraged her to be an independent and brave woman. Her teachers also had an impact in her life due to the fact that they were supportive and dedicated to their profession. Martinez's early life provided many experiences that influenced her work as a community activist.
Later on, Martinez attended East Los Angeles Community College. From there, she transferred to  University of California, Riverside. She graduated with a Bachelor of Music in 1980, and in 1984 she received a master's degree in Music and History.

Work experience 

Community activities:

 Organization affiliations/Committee participation
 Adelante Mujer Latina, Advisory Committee
 City of Pasadena, Civic Center Public Art, Advisory Committee
 City of Pasadena, Pasadena Community Access Corporation, Producer's Committee
 Latino Heritage, Executive Director and Founder
 Leadership Pasadena, Alumna
 Pasadena City College, President's Latino Advisory Committee
 Pasadena Digital History Collaborative, Advisory Committee
 Pasadena Museum of History, Family Stories Exhibit, Advisory Committee
 Pasadena Latino Forum, Founding Member
 Pasadena Northwest Renaissance Committee, Cultural History consultant
 Pasadena Unified School District, District Task Force, Committee member
 Southwest Chamber Music, Carlos Chavez Committee, Member
 Facilitator/Teaching experience:
 Per Diem Facilitator, A World of Difference Program, Anti Defamation League
 Instructor, Music Introduction, Los Angeles Trade Tech
 Substitute, elementary & middle schools, Pasadena Unified School District
 Substitute, private schools in Altadena, Pasadena, Sierra Madre
 Classroom teacher – Spanish as Second Language, Preschool; St. Mark's Episcopal Day School, Altadena
 Classroom teacher – Music/Literacy focus, Washington Elementary School, Pasadena Unified School District
 Participation/Presentations
 ArroyoFest, History of the Arroyo, Event Emcee, Panelist
 Aztec Stories Project – CD and educational concerts, narration, percussion and vocals
 Harvest in the Field of Grace – Moderator/Salon Participant
 Latino Theater Company, Cathedral of Our Lady of the Angels, La Virgen de Tepeyac, coro
 Leadership Pasadena – Quality of Life Session, Telling our Stories, Lecturer
 Origins Arts and Culture Festival – U are Here: Roots of the Craftsman style home, panelist
 Author/Writer
 Arcadia Publishing, Images of America: Latinos in Pasadena, 2009
 A Pasadena Latina, Blog
 Pasadena Now/Pasadena Hoy, contributing columnist

Honors and awards 
Martinez has received multiple honors and awards throughout her career years.
 YWCA – Woman of Excellence
 Adam Schiff
 29th Congressional District
 Woman Of The Year
 Western States Region of the Alliance for Community Media Award
 City of Pasadena
 Human Relations Commission
 Harry Sheldon Award
 The 50 Fabulous Women of Influence
 “Pasadena Magazine”

Personal life 
She currently lives in Pasadena, California with her husband, James Grimes and with their son, Matthew.  She currently serves as the volunteer Executive Director of Latino Heritage, the Chair of the Library Commission of the City of Pasadena, and a board member of the Pasadena Senior Center, serving on the Governance Committee. Martinez has kept a writing blog “A Pasadena Latina” since 2010. She will soon begin writing in one of the Pasadena's newsletter called “Pasadena Now.” She is currently employed as an independent consultant and researcher.

Notes

References 
 
 
 
 

1952 births
Living people
Hispanic and Latino American writers
People from East Los Angeles, California
People from Pasadena, California